The 39th Annual GMA Dove Awards presentation was held on April 23, 2008 recognizing accomplishments of musicians for the year 2007. The show was held at the Grand Ole Opry House in Nashville, Tennessee.

Nominations were announced on February 14, 2008 by singer Michael W. Smith and Elle Duncan at a press conference.

TobyMac won three awards, including Artist of the Year, while Brandon Heath won New Artist of the Year. Mark Hall and David Crowder Band each won three awards also. Other multiple winners include: Casting Crowns, Chris Tomlin, Ernie Haase & Signature Sound, Israel & New Breed, and Trin-I-Tee 5:7.

Performers

The following performed at the telecast ceremony:

Awards

General

Artist of the Year
Casting Crowns
Chris Tomlin
Natalie Grant
Point of Grace
Skillet
The Clark Sisters
TobyMac

New Artist of the Year
33 Miles
Austins Bridge
Brandon Heath
DeWayne Woods
Group 1 Crew
Mandisa
Rush of Fools

Group of the Year
Casting Crowns
David Crowder Band
Ernie Haase & Signature Sound
Hillsong United
Point of Grace
Selah
The Clark Sisters

Male Vocalist of the Year
Chris Tomlin
Gerald Wolfe
Jon Foreman
Mark Hall
Mark Schultz
Marvin Sapp
TobyMac

Female Vocalist of the Year
Amy Grant
Christy Nockels
Darlene Zschech
Krystal Meyers
Mandisa
Natalie Grant
Sandi Patty

Song of the Year
 "Amazing Grace (My Chains Are Gone)" – Chris Tomlin
Chris Tomlin, Louie Giglio, Traditional, songwriters
 "Bring the Rain" – MercyMe
Bart Millard, James Bryson, Nathan Cochran, Barry Graul, Michael John Scheuchzer, Robin Shaffer, songwriters
 "East to West" – Casting Crowns
Mark Hall, Bernie Herms, songwriters
 "Give You Glory" – Jeremy Camp
Jeremy Camp, songwriter
 "How You Live (Turn Up the Music)" – Point of Grace
Cindy Morgan, songwriter
 "I'm Not Who I Was" – Brandon Heath
Brandon Heath, songwriter
 "In Better Hands" – Natalie Grant
Catt Gravitt, Jim Daddario, Thom Hardwell, songwriters
 "Made to Love" – TobyMac
Toby McKeehan, Cary Barlowe, Jamie Moore, Aaron Rice, songwriters
 "Tears of the Saints" – Leeland
Leeland Mooring, Jack Mooring, songwriters
 "Undo" – Rush of Fools
William Davis, Kevin Huguley, Wes Willis, songwriters

Songwriter of the Year
Cindy Morgan

Producer of the Year
Bernie Herms
Ed Cash
Ian Eskelin
Israel Houghton
Nathan Nockels

Pop

Pop/Contemporary Recorded Song of the Year
 "East to West" – Casting Crowns
 "I'm Not Who I Was" – Brandon Heath
 "In Better Hands" – Natalie Grant
 "Tears of the Saints" – Leeland
 "Undo" – Rush of Fools

Pop/Contemporary Album of the Year
 Blink – Plumb
 GO Remixed – Newsboys
 How You Live – Point of Grace
 Rush of Fools – Rush of Fools
 The Altar and the Door – Casting Crowns Whispered and Shouted – Aaron Shust

Rock
Rock Recorded Song of the Year
 "Break Me Down" – Red
 "Comatose" – Skillet "I Need You" – Relient K
 "Million Voices" – BarlowGirl
 "Procrastinating" – Stellar Kart

Rock/Contemporary Recorded Song of the Year
 "After the World" – Disciple
 "Awakening" – Switchfoot
 "Everything Glorious" – David Crowder Band "Glorious One" – Fee
 "Signature of Divine (Yahweh)" – Needtobreathe

Rock Album of the Year
 Jungle of the Midwest Sea – Flatfoot 56
 Live from Hawaii: The Farewell Concert – Audio Adrenaline
 Scars Remain – Disciple Secret Weapon – MxPx
 Twilight – Future of Forestry

Rock/Contemporary Album of the Year
 How Can We Be Silent – BarlowGirl
 Oh! Gravity – Switchfoot
 Portable Sounds – TobyMac Remedy – David Crowder Band
 The Heat – Needtobreathe

Rap/Hip-Hop
Rap/Hip-Hop Recorded Song of the Year
 "Name Droppin'" – T-Bone "Open Bar" – GRITS
 "Wake Up" – KJ-52 featuring Toby Morrell
 "Who Am I?" – Da' T.R.U.T.H. featuring Tye Tribbett
 "Word of Mouth" – John Reuben

Rap/Hip-Hop Album of the Year
 Group 1 Crew – Group 1 Crew Redemption – GRITS
 The Yearbook – KJ-52
 Unleashed – L.A. Symphony
 Word of Mouth – John Reuben

Inspirational
Inspirational Recorded Song of the Year
 "Be Lifted High" – Michael W. Smith
 "Be Thou Near To Me" – Selah
 "By His Wounds" – Steven Curtis Chapman, Mark Hall, Brian Littrell, and Mac Powell "Give Me Jesus" – Jeremy Camp
 "God Speaking" – Ronnie Freeman

Inspirational Album of the Year
 Amazing Freedom – Women of Faith Worship Team
 Falling Forward – Sandi Patty
 I Love to Tell the Story, A Hymns Collection – Mark Lowry In Christ Alone – Keith & Kristyn Getty
 Speak To Me – Geoff Moore

Gospel
Southern Gospel Recorded Song of the Year
 "Get Away Jordan" – Ernie Haase & Signature Sound "I'm Just Waiting for My Ride" – The Hoppers
 "Last Night"" – Karen Peck & New River
 "Orphans of God"" – The Talley Trio
 "Over And Over"" – Jeff & Sheri Easter

Southern Gospel Album of the Year
 Get Away, Jordan – Ernie Haase & Signature Sound Journey of Joy – Karen Peck & New River
 Real Faith – Brian Free & Assurance
 Sounds Like Sunday – Janet Paschal
 The Ride – The Hoppers

Traditional Gospel Recorded Song of the Year
 "Happy Day" – Lillie Knauls & The Talley Trio
 "I Can't Stop Praising Him" – New Harvest
 "Ready for a Miracle" – LeAnn Rimes "Selah" – GMWA
 "The Light" – Ricky Dillard & New G

Traditional Gospel Album of the Year
 Closest Friend – The Rance Allen Group
 Complete – LaShun Pace
 Live in Dallas 2006 – GMWA
 New Harvest – New Harvest
 Past and Present – Lillie Knauls Still Standing – Bishop Paul S. Morton

Contemporary Gospel Recorded Song of the Year
 "Be The Miracle" – Room for Two
 "Blessed & Highly Favored" – The Clark Sisters
 "Come On" – Calvin Hunt
 "Say So" – Israel & New Breed "You Saved Me" – The Crabb Family

Contemporary Gospel Album of the Year
 A Deeper Level – Israel & New Breed Brand New Day – Jonathan Butler
 Bridges – Calvin Hunt
 Live – One Last Time – The Clark Sisters
 The Gospel According to Patti LaBelle – Patti LaBelle

Country and Bluegrass
Country Recorded Song of the Year
 "Anyway" – Martina McBride
 "Drug Problem" – The Bellamy Brothers
 "How You Live (Turn Up The Music)" – Point of Grace "James Whit" – Little Roy Lewis, Earl Scruggs, and Lizzy Long
 "'Round The Kitchen Table" – Karen Peck & New River

Country Album of the Year
 Austins Bridge – Austins Bridge
 Big Sky – The Isaacs Gospel Duets with Treasured Friends – Brenda Lee
 Jesus Is Coming – The Bellamy Brothers
 Life Is Great and Gettin' Better! – Jeff & Sheri Easter
 Songs of Inspiration II – Alabama

Bluegrass Recorded Song of the Year
 "He's in Control" – Austins Bridge "I Will Find You Again" – Little Roy Lewis, Earl Scruggs, and Lizzy Long
 "Love Will Be Enough" – Ricky Skaggs & The Whites
 "Salt of the Earth" – Ricky Skaggs & The Whites
 "The Key To Heaven" – The Lewis Family

Bluegrass Album of the Year
 God's Masterpiece – The Marksmen
 Lifetimes – Little Roy Lewis, Earl Scruggs, and Lizzy Long
 Salt of the Earth – Ricky Skaggs & The Whites Tell Someone – Kenny & Amanda Smith Band
 Where No One Stands Alone – Paul Williams & The Victory Trio

Praise & Worship
Worship Song of the Year
 "Amazing Grace (My Chains Are Gone)" – Chris Tomlin
 Chris Tomlin, Louie Giglio, songwriters
 "Everlasting God" – Brenton Brown
Brenton Brown, Ken Riley, songwriters
 "Everything Glorious" – David Crowder Band
David Crowder, songwriter
 "How Great Is Our God" – Chris TomlinChris Tomlin, Jesse Reeves, Ed Cash, songwriters "Praise You in This Storm" – Casting Crowns
Mark Hall, Bernie Herms, songwriters

Praise & Worship Album of the Year
 All of the Above – Hillsong United
 Manifesto – Pocket Full of Rocks
 Our God Saves – Paul Baloche
 Remedy – David Crowder Band We Shine – Fee

Children's Music
Children's Music Album of the Year
 Absolute Modern Worship for Kids 3 – Kid Connection
 deliberateKids – Phil Joel
 My Father's World – The Praise Baby Collection
 Snazzy – Go Fish
 Supernatural – Hillsong Kids
 VeggieTales Christian Hit Music – VeggieTalesUrban
Urban Recorded Song of the Year
 "I Can" – New Harvest
 "I Love Me Better Than That" – Shirley Murdock
 "I'm Not Perfect" – J Moss
 "Listen" – Trin-I-Tee 5:7 "Simply Because" – Darlene McCoy

Urban Album of the Year
 Church Girl – Onitsha
 Darlene McCoy – Darlene McCoy
 Restoration Vol. 1 – Terrence Mackey & Nu Restoration
 T57 – Trin-I-Tee 5:7 V2 – J Moss

Others
Instrumental Album of the Year
 Amazing Grace (Original Score) – David Arnold Holy! Piano & Orchestra – Terry MacAlmon
 In The Garden – Eric Wyse
 Let's Get Quiet: The Smooth Jazz Experience – Ben Tankard
 The Nativity Story (Original Score) – Mychael Danna

Spanish Language Album of the Year
 Bueno – Jacobo Ramos y Sediento
 De Corazón a Corazón – Seth Condrey El Ritmo de la Vida – Julissa
 En Lo Secreto – Lucía Parker
 Invencible – Vertical
 Tu Amor – Danilo Montero

Special Event Album of the Year
 Amazing Grace (Gaither Music Group)
 Evan Almighty Soundtrack (Curb Records)
 Glory Revealed (Reunion Records) Music Inspired By the Motion Picture Amazing Grace (Sparrow Records)
 Songs 4 Worship Country (Integrity Music/Time-Life)

Christmas Album of the Year
 Christmas From the Realms of Glory – Bebo Norman
 Christmas Songs – Jars of Clay
 It's a Wonderful Christmas – Michael W. Smith Noël – Josh Groban
 One Wintry Night – David Phelps

Choral Collection of the Year
 God Is in This Place – Regi Stone
 He Is Great – Geron Davis
 Heaven – Mike Speck and Cliff Duren
 Let The Redeemed Say So – Lari Goss Made To Worship – Travis Cottrell

Recorded Music Packaging of the Year
 Cities – Anberlin
 Remedy – David Crowder Band Rival Factions – Project 86
 Secrets Keep You Sick – The Fold
 The Fiancée – The Chariot

Musicals
Musical of the Year
3:16 The Numbers of Hope
All Bow DownAmazing Grace – My Chains Are Gone
I've Seen Jesus
Unspeakable Joy

Youth/Children's Musical
Bows of Holly
Livin' Inside Out
No Wonder!
Praise Rocks
The Mystery of the Manger

Videos

Short Form Music Video of the Year
 "Awakening" – Switchfoot
Brandon Dickerson (video director), Lauren Schwartz (video producer)
 "Boomin'" – TobyMac
Scott Speer (video director), Jason Peterson (video producer)
 "Falls Apart" – Thousand Foot Krutch
Travis Copatch (video director), Jeremy Sullivan (video producer)
 "Foreverandever, etc." – David Crowder Band
Sam J. Stanton (video director), Mark Steele and Kevin Anderson (video producers)
 "Name Droppin'" – T-Bone
Bart Conover (video director and producer)
 "Never Let Me Go" – Family Force 5
Ken Horstmann (video director and producer)

Long Form Music Video of the Year
 777 – Underoath
Michelle Caputo and Shannon Hartman (video directors)
 Get Away, Jordan – Ernie Haase & Signature Sound
Doug Stuckey (video director), Bill Gaither and Ernie Haase (video producers)
 Live from Hawaii: The Farewell Concert – Audio AdrenalineMark McCallie (video director), Audio Adrenaline (video producers)' Live from Portland – Kutless
Carl Diebold (video director), Michael Sacci (video producer)
 No More Night: Live in Birmingham'' – David Phelps
Russell E. Hall (video director), David Phelps and Jim Chaffee (video producers)

Artists with multiple nominations and awards

The following artists received multiple nominations:
 Six: Mark Hall
 Five: Chris Tomlin, TobyMac, David Crowder Band
 Four: Casting Crowns, The Clark Sisters, Jeremy Camp, Ernie Haase & Signature Sound, Ricky Skaggs, Point of Grace

The following artists received multiple awards:
 Three: TobyMac, Mark Hall, David Crowder Band
 Two: Casting Crowns, Chris Tomlin, Ernie Haase & Signature Sound, Israel & New Breed, Trin-I-Tee 5:7

References

External links
Nominations announced for the 39th Dove Awards at CBN

Dove Awards
GMA Dove Awards
2008 in American music
2008 in Tennessee
GMA